Blake Chester Pietila (born February 20, 1993) is an American professional ice hockey left winger who is currently an unrestricted free agent. He most recently played for the Hershey Bears in the American Hockey League (AHL). Pietila was drafted by the New Jersey Devils in the 5th round of the 2011 NHL Entry Draft.

Playing career
As a youth, Pietila played in the 2006 Quebec International Pee-Wee Hockey Tournament with the Detroit Compuware minor ice hockey team.

Pietila, of Finnish descent through his grandfather, played collegiate hockey with Michigan Tech of the Western Collegiate Hockey Association. After his four-year college career was completed after his senior season in 2014–15, Pietila, who was the captain, was signed to a two-year entry level contract with the New Jersey Devils on May 27, 2015.

In his debut professional season in 2015–16, Pietila was initially reassigned to AHL affiliate, the Albany Devils. He later made his NHL debut for the Devils on March 24, 2016, against the Pittsburgh Penguins. He recorded his first NHL goal on March 31, 2016, against the Florida Panthers with only 5.1 seconds remaining in a 3-2 loss.

On July 26, 2017, the Devils re-signed Pietila to a two-year, two-way contract worth $1.335 million and $667,000 annually.

On July 2, 2019, Pietila left the Devils organization after four seasons as a free agent to sign a one-year, two-way contract with the Anaheim Ducks for the 2019–20 season. He played the duration of his contract with the Ducks assigned to AHL affiliate, the San Diego Gulls, recording 12 goals and 24 points through 49 regular season games before the season was cancelled due to the COVID-19 pandemic.

As a free agent from the Ducks leading into the pandemic delayed 2020–21 season, Pietila belatedly signed a professional tryout contract with the Hershey Bears of the AHL, affiliate to the Washington Capitals, on February 8, 2021.

Career statistics

Regular season and playoffs

International

Awards and honors

References

External links
 

1993 births
Living people
Albany Devils players
American people of Finnish descent
American men's ice hockey left wingers
Binghamton Devils players
Hershey Bears players
Michigan Tech Huskies men's ice hockey players
People from Milford, Michigan
Ice hockey players from Michigan
New Jersey Devils draft picks
New Jersey Devils players
San Diego Gulls (AHL) players
USA Hockey National Team Development Program players